Alfaz Ahmed (born: 7 July 1973) is a retired Bangladeshi footballer who played for the Bangladesh national football team from 1995 to 2008. He is seen as one of the best strikers to ever play for Bangladesh.

He won three international trophies while playing for his country. Alfaz also scored the winning goal of the 1999 South Asian Games final, against Nepal. He played for Bangladesh 13 years, scoring 11 goals along the way. Alfaz also has 109 domestic league goals, including numerous goals in AFC club competitions. Although he played as a striker for the national team, Alfaz was  often used as a playmaking forward at domestic level. Alfaz is currently head coach of the Mohammedan SC.

Club career

Early career
Alfaz started his football career in 1985 in the Youth Football League. He wore the Orient Sporting jersey in the Pioneer League in 1987. He played for Lalbagh Sporting in the second division during the 1988–89 season. Alfaz Ahmed started his journey in the Dhaka domestic football with Rahmatganj MFS during the 1991-92 Dhaka League season. In 1992, his quality performances for Rahmatganj, earned him a move to league giants Abahani Limited Dhaka as a guest player during the 1994 Charms Cup. At that time, however, there was no shortage of star players at Abahani, and so, Alfaz had to spend most of his time sitting on the bench.

After being on the fringes at Abahani during his short stay at the club, he moved to mid-table side Arambagh KS in 1994, in order to get more game time. It was at Arambagh, where Alfaz regained his old form and after an impressive lone season at the club, his consistent goals for the club earned him his first ever Bangladesh national team call up, after a year at the club. Following his lone season, Alfaz joined Abahani's arch-rivals Mohammedan SC, and thus became one of the most lethal strikers Bangladesh ever produced.

Mohammedan
In 1995, after  joining Mohammedan, Alfaz became one of the best players in the country during the late 90s. Although, he started his career as an attacking midfielder, in 1996 Mohammedan coach at the time Kang Man-young converted him into a striker. Alfaz went on to score in the first two matches in his new position, against Bangladesh Boys and Victoria SC, and thus he started playing regularly in that position. He also helped Mohammedan SC win the 1995 Federation Cup by defeating his former club Dhaka Abahani in the final.

However, during his first season at the club, he failed to win the prestigious Dhaka League title. Nonetheless, the next season saw Alfaz guide Mohammedan to the league title and also helped the club reach the second round of the 1996 Asian Cup Winners Cup. In August 1996, Ahmed was elected as "AFC's player of the month", for scoring four goals including a treble for Mohammedan in the AFC Cup Winners Cup in Bangladesh, against Laotian club Electricity of Lao. During his spell at the club, Alfaz became the league's second highest scorer twice, with 11 goals in both 1997 and 1999, in addition to that, in 1996, he became the third highest scorer in the league with 10 goals.

Mohun Bagan
Alfaz joined Kolkata giants Mohun Bagan, in 2000. He went onto appear 6 times for the club during the 2000–01 National Football League, playing as striker behind the Brazilian José Barreto.

Domestic League journey
In 2004, Brothers who were well known as the country's third biggest club signed local stars along with Alfaz, Arman Mia, Titu, Monwar, Rajnai and Biplob all joined. The star-studded team went on to lift the National Championship  and the Dhaka League titles.

After returning to Mohammedan in 2005, Alfaz scored against rivals Abahani and also assisted the first goal for Divine Chibiuka, during the final of the 2005 National League, while captaining his side. Mohammedan went on to secure the league title winning the game 2–0, and this was Alfaz's fourth consecutive National Championship win. He then once again departed, this time joining Muktijoddha for the start of the country's first ever professional league, the B.League, in 2007.

On 27 March 2007, Alfaz netted the first hat-trick in B.League history to give Muktijoddha SKC a 4–1 win over Rahmatganj MFS. In 2008, Alfaz joined minnows Sheikh Russel KC and scored 18 league goals, helping the club finish third in the league, his most memorable performance that season was the hattrick he scored against Khulna Abahani, as Sheikh Russel won the game 5–0.  The following year he returned to his boyhood club Arambagh KS, although he got a better offer from newcomers Beanibazar SC of Sylhet. He scored twice in his return game against Chittagong Mohammedan. He helped Arambagh finish fifth that year, and scored 12 league goals, which was the fourth most in the league for a single player during that season.

Final years
His last few years playing professionally saw, Alfaz sign for Abahani after almost 20 years. Eventhough, Alfaz was not a regular at the team he managed to lift the 2010 Bordoloi Trophy, defeating Nepali side Three Star Club in the final. Following a lone season at the club, Alfaz joined Team BJMC who were given direct entry to the league in 2012 after 27 years, due to the clubs great history. Although the transfer was controversial as the club was not able to submit adequate fees for registration and had unsigned papers.

On 7 April 2013, at the age of 42, Alfaz retired from professional football after a glorious 28-year career which saw him win numerous trophies and individual honors with club and country. During his last match, Alfaz once again captained Mohammedan against Dhaka Abahani in the Dhaka Derby.

International career
After playing at Arambagh for a year, Korean coach Kang Man-young selected Alfaz for the 1995 South Asian Gold Cup squad, and handed him his debut during the competition on 25 March 1995, against Pakistan. In October 1995, newly appointed German coach Otto Pfister kept him in the team for the 4-nation Tiger Trophy in Myanmar, which became the country's first ever international trophy. However, after returning from Myanmar, Alfaz was dropped from the team.

In 1997, Alfaz made his return to the team under Iranian head coach Samir Shaker. He played all six 1998 FIFA World Cup qualifiers for the country, and scored his first goal during a 2–1 victory over Taiwan, on 18 March 1997. Alfaz went onto play the 1999 SAFF Cup, scoring against Pakistan in the group stages and the winner against Nepal in the semi-finals. However, he was left devastated as Bangladesh crashed out of the final against India.

However, during the 1999 South Asian Games which took place four months after the SAFF Cup ended, Bangladesh overcame India in the semi finals and went on to win the final, against Nepal. Alfaz scored the only goal during the game, just before the first half ended, thus the nation earned its first gold medal. The following year, Alfaz scored a brace against South Asian counterparts India, during 2000 AFC Asian Cup qualifiers.

On 12 February 2001, during the 2002 FIFA World Cup qualifiers held in Dammam, the newly appointed captain Alfaz displayed the best individual performance in his career, as Bangladesh defeated Mongolia 3–0. Alfaz scored the first goal by fainting away from three Mongolian defenders and shooting from just outside the penalty area. His second goal was a solo effort, after receiving the ball on the left, he outpaced a defender, and cut inside to score from a tight angle and double his teams lead.

In 2003, Alfaz won his third title for Bangladesh, the 2003 SAFF Championship, Alfaz played all five games during the tournament, scoring against Nepal in the group stages. ALfaz went on to play the 2005 SAFF Championship, however this time his team was defeated in the final. His next goals came against Cambodia and Tajikistan respectively during the 2006 AFC Challenge Cup. The same year Alfaz, announced his retirement from international football after playing the 2007 AFC Asian Cup qualifiers. He returned to the national team in 2007 for the Nehru Cup held in India. However, his return was short lived as he was dropped from the national team in 2008, for the 2010 FIFA World Cup qualification – AFC First Round.

Managerial career
In 2015, Alfaz got his UEFA C license. He preceded to work at his former club Mohammedan as an assistant coach. Alfaz went on to coach Bangladesh Army football team, and was also part of the Bangladesh women's national football team coaching panel. In 2019, Alfaz completed his AFC A license course.

Uttar Baridhara
On 11 November 2019, newly promoted Uttar Baridhara appointed Alfaz as the club's head coach. During the 2019–20 Federation Cup he made his debut as a manager. The inexperienced Utar Baridhara team were not able to score during all three group stage game, as Alfaz took the risk of playing local striker Sumon Reza. On 13 February 2019, Alfaz made his league debut as a manager against Bashundhara Kings, and even though Baridhara defended well they ended up losing the game 1–0. Nonetheless, after a 8-game winless run, Alfaz was removed from his managerial post, in March 2020.

Mohammedan SC
Since his retirement from professional football, Alfaz has been a regular member in Mohammedan's coaching panel. He currently the club's assistant coach, under former national team player Shafiqul Islam Manik.

On 1 March 2023, he was appointed as the head coach of Mohammedan SC
.

Personal life
Although Alfaz's hometown is at Zakiganj in Sylhet, he was born in Dhaka, as his father was attending work in the capital.

In 2020, Alfaz put up his 1999 Saff-winning jersey on auction to raise money for people affected from the COVID-19 pandemic in Bangladesh.

International goals
Scores and results list Bangladesh's goal tally first.

International goals for club
Scores and results list Dhaka Mohammedan's goal tally first.

Dhaka Mohammedan SC

Club statistics

Managerial statistics

Honours

Player

Club
Mohammedan Sporting Club
Premier Division League (2): 1996,1999
National Football Championship (2): 2001–02,2005–06
Federation Cup (2): 1995,2002
Bangladesh Super Cup (1): 2013
 
Dhaka Abahani Ltd.
Bangladesh Super Cup (1): 2011

Muktijoddha Sangsad KC
National Football Championship (1): 2003
Federation Cup (1): 2003

Brothers Union
National Football Championship (1): 2004

International

Bangladesh
SAFF Championship: 2003
South Asian Games Gold medal: 1999
4-nation Tiger Trophy: 1995

References

External links
 

Bangladeshi footballers
1973 births
Living people
Footballers at the 2002 Asian Games
People from Sylhet
Association football forwards
South Asian Games gold medalists for Bangladesh
Asian Games competitors for Bangladesh
South Asian Games medalists in football
Bangladesh international footballers
Team BJMC players
Brothers Union players
Arambagh KS players
Muktijoddha Sangsad KC players
Sheikh Russel KC players
Mohammedan SC (Dhaka) players
Rahmatganj MFS players
Bangladeshi expatriate footballers
Bangladeshi expatriate sportspeople in India
Expatriate footballers in India
National Football League (India) players
Mohun Bagan AC players
Bangladeshi football managers
Bangladeshi football coaches
Calcutta Football League players